The 2020–21 Bangladesh Championship League was the 9th season of the Bangladesh Championship League since its establishment in 2012. A total of 12 football clubs is competing in the league. T&T Club Motijheel withdrew from the league due to their financial issues. Swadhinata KS clinched their first title, with NoFeL SC following in second.

The league was kicked off on 7 February 2021. It was originally scheduled to be completed within 25 June, but ended on 19 July as the league was postponed few times due to coronavirus pandemic.

Team

Team changes
The following teams have changed division since the previous season:

To BCL
Relegated from BPL
 NoFeL SC
 Team BJMC  

Promoted from Dhaka Senior Division League
 Kawran Bazar Pragati Sangha
 Dhaka Wanderers Club

From BCL
Promoted to BPL
 Uttar Baridhara SC
 Bangladesh Police FC

Relegated to Dhaka Senior Division League
 Soccer Club Feni

Teams locations

Venues
All matches were held at the BSSS Mostafa Kamal Stadium & Bangabandhu National Stadium in Dhaka, Bangladesh.

League table

Results

Season statistics

Goalscorers

Hat-tricks

Own goals 
† Bold Club indicates winner of the match

Cleansheets

References

2021 in Bangladeshi football
2021 in Bangladeshi sport
2021 in Bangladesh
2021 in association football
2021 in Asian football